Kaliya Mardan (also known as The Childhood of Krishna) is a 1919 Indian silent film directed by Dadasaheb Phalke. It contains Marathi subtitles. Only 4441 ft are still available.

References

External links 
 
 Full movie on YouTube

1919 films
Indian black-and-white films
Indian silent films
Articles containing video clips
1910s Marathi-language films
Films directed by Dadasaheb Phalke